Pál Fejős (27 January 1897 – 23 April 1963), known professionally as Paul Fejos, was a Hungarian-American director of feature films and documentaries who worked in a number of countries including the United States. He also studied medicine in his youth and became a prominent anthropologist later in life. During World War I, Fejos worked as a medical orderly for the Imperial Austrian Army on the Italian front lines and also managed a theatre that performed for troops. After the war, he returned to Budapest and eventually worked for the Orient-Film production company. He began to direct films in 1919 or 1920 for Mobil Studios in Hungary until he escaped in 1923 to flee the White Terror and the Horthy regime. He made his way to New York City and then eventually to Hollywood where he began production on his first American feature film, The Last Moment, in October 1927. The film proved to be popular, which allowed him to sign with Universal Studios. After a number of other successful films, Fejos left America in 1931 to direct sound films in France. In 1941 he stopped making films all together and became the Director of Research and the acting head of the Viking Fund.

Early life
Fejos was born in Budapest, Hungary, as Pál Fejős to parents Desiré Fejős and his wife Aurora (née Novelly). He had an older sister, Olga Fejős. Like many film directors, Fejos exaggerated or invented myths for large portions of his life story and according to him his father was a captain with the Hussars and his mother was a Lady-in-waiting for the Austrian-Hungarian Empress, and that as a youth Fejos himself was an official of the Imperial Court. The truth was that his mother's family originated from Italy but did have an aristocratic background and his father was a pharmacist in Dunaföldvár. Shortly before Fejos was born his father sold his business and moved the family to Budapest in order to buy a shop there, but died of a heart attack before the new shop was purchased. He was then raised by his mother in his grandparents' home. As a boy he was said to be a smart student and to have loved films from an early age. He was sent to a school run by Piarist Fathers in Veszprém and later to a school in Kecskemét. He eventually studied medicine and in 1921 he received an M.D. from the Royal Hungarian Medical University of Budapest. In 1914 he married his first wife Mara Jankowsky. World War I started soon afterward and Fejos worked as a medical orderly for the Imperial Austrian Army on the Italian front lines. During the war he also managed a theatre that performed for the troops. Some additional myths about Fejos' life that surfaced a year later include that he was an officer in the Hussars, was wounded three times, and that he was the first person to pilot a combat airplane. After the war Fejos returned to Budapest and began working as a set painter for an opera company and eventually for the Orient-Film production company. He was divorced from his first wife in 1921, allegedly because of his irrational jealousy.

Early film career
Fejos first began directing films in either 1919 or 1920 for Mobil Studios in Hungary. His earliest silent films included Pán, a fantasy based on the mythological character, Lord Arthur Savile's Crime, based on a play by Oscar Wilde, The Black Captain, a film about police corruption in New York City, The Last of Arsène Lupin, a remake of the popular American serial film, and The Queen of Spades, based on the novel by Alexander Pushkin. Fejos always saw film as closer to painting than to theatre and was more concerned about issues of light and shadow than story. He also stated at this time that no great film would be made until it could be shot in color.

Just as other prominent Hungarian filmmakers like Michael Curtiz and Alexander Korda had done, Fejos left Hungary in 1923 to escape the White Terror and the Horthy regime. He first traveled to Vienna where he was briefly employed by Max Reinhardt, then to Berlin where he worked as an extra on Fritz Lang's Die Nibelungen. He then moved to Paris where he staged an unsuccessful production of Walter Hasenclever's avant-garde play L'Homme. He finally emigrated to the United States in October 1923. He arrived in New York City penniless and spoke little English, but managed to get several low paying jobs at funeral parlors or piano factories. By the spring of 1924 his English had improved and he managed to get a job as a laboratory technician at the Rockefeller Institute for Medical Research. He earned $80 a week and was employed there for two years. In 1925 he married a co-worker named Mimosa Pfalz, but the marriage lasted only 30 days. While living in New York he did manage to land one theater gig as a technical advisor to ensure the Hungarian atmosphere of an adaptation of Ferenc Molnár's The Glass Slipper. In the spring of 1926, Fejos spent his entire life savings of $45 on an old Buick and took a cross country trip to move to Los Angeles in pursuit of a film career there.

Hollywood career
When Fejos arrived in Hollywood he once again struggled to get by and only managed to land a few odd jobs working on scripts. Sometimes he would survive by hitchhiking to Pasadena to steal fruit from orange orchards. On one of his hitchhiking trips he was picked up by a rich, young New Yorker named Edward Spitz, who had recently moved to Hollywood with ambitions to produce films. Fejos told Spitz about his film career in Hungary and convinced Spitz to finance a film. Spitz agreed to give Fejos $5,000 to make a feature film, which was approximately only about 1% of the average film budget at that time. Fejos managed to work with this small budget and began production on his first American feature in October 1927. He was able to convince actor friends to appear in the film for free with the promise of compensation if it was successful, and even charmed Charlie Chaplin's frequent co-star Georgia Hale to appear in the film with the same promise at a time when Hale was earning $5,000 a week. He hired the inexperienced cameraman Leon Shamroy to shoot the film and rented studio space by the minute instead of by the day. Fejos also utilized sets that had been used for other films and made changes to the script when circumstances changed. When sets or actors were unavailable, Fejos had his crew film close-ups of hands, feet, cars or anything else that stuck him as interesting. Fejos was also able to get free film stock from the DuPont company, which was then trying to compete with the more established Kodak and Agfa companies. Filming lasted for 28 days.

The Last Moment starred Otto Matieson as a man who commits suicide by drowning and then remembers the events of his life that lead up to his death in flashbacks. The finished film was seven reels and silent, but contained no title cards. It is currently a lost film, but a review described it as having "dizzying wipes, multiple superimpositions and vertiginous camera movements." The Last Moment was released in 1928 and received rave reviews and was a financial hit. Charlie Chaplin praised it and writer Tamar Lane called it "one of the most remarkable films that has ever been presented on the screen." With the film's success and Fejos's overnight celebrity status, major studios were suddenly competing for the former vagrant to sign contracts with them. Fejos settled with Universal Studios because its contract offered him complete artistic control.

In 1928 Fejos quickly began production on his next and best-known film: Lonesome. The script was written by Edward T. Lowe Jr. and Tom Reed, and was based on a newspaper article about loneliness in the modern American cities. Carl Laemmle Jr. produced the film. In the film Glenn Tryon and Barbara Kent play two lonely New Yorkers who live in adjoining apartments but have never met. They meet by chance at Coney Island and begin a romance, but lose each other only to be reunited at their apartment building. The film was hand-tinted and stencil-colored at many points, making it already visually distinctive, but after it had gone into general release as a silent film in mid-June 1928, Universal borrowed a Movietone News sound recording truck from Fox Film on the pretext of making sound tests (their own sound stages would not be ready until late October)  and hurriedly recorded "talkie" scenes and synchronized music-and-effects scores by recently hired musical director Joseph Cherniavsky to attach to three already-completed silent features; Lonesome was the first of these to be so treated, with no input from Fejos on the dialogue sequences, and this version was released on 20 September. (After this first hastily accomplished phase, Universal continued using Fox's equipment to make their own first all-talking film, Melody of Love - which is also the first film musical - in under two weeks, at which time a chagrined and angry crew from Fox came to Universal City and repossessed their sound truck.) Lonesome was another box office hit and its reputation has grown throughout the years. Georges Sadoul called it a precursor to neorealism. Jonathan Rosenbaum praised the film and compared Fejos to such better known contemporaries as F. W. Murnau, Fritz Lang, Sergei Eisenstein, and Vsevolod Pudovkin. Andrew Sarris has called it "a tender love story in its silent passages...[but] crude, clumsy and tediously tongue-tied in its talkie passages." Charles Higham stated that although "its visual style, initially attractive, becomes a monotonous succession of busy shots, dissolving over each other in a perpetual flurry...[but] the films charm is real."

Fejos's third Hollywood film was The Last Performance, another box office success for Universal Studios in 1929. The film starred Conrad Veidt as a stage magician who falls in love with his assistant and was another part sound, part silent film. Later that year Fejos began production on his largest and most ambitious film: Broadway, based on the hit stage production produced by Jed Harris, George Abbott, and Phillip Dunning. Fejos was given a $1 million budget, most of which was spent on the huge cubist nightclub set and on a 28-ton camera crane, which was the largest and most versatile crane built up to that point. The film starred Glenn Tryon and Evelyn Brent. When released, the film was only a modest success and Fejos considered it a failure. It was remade by William A. Seiter in 1942. Film critic Miles Krueger said that "the images of the Paradise Club and the huge musical number (Final in Technicolor) have become basic screen literature."

Fejos then began filming the musical Captain of the Guard (AKA Marsellaise) in 1930, the year he became an American citizen. During the shooting of an ambitious sequence with over 300 extras that depicted the storming of the Bastille, Fejos fell from a high scaffolding and suffered a concussion. It took him six weeks in bed to recover and John S. Robertson finished the film, with Fejos receiving no screen credit. He then worked on King of Jazz, which was officially directed by John Murray Anderson. Fejos became angry with Universal that once again he did not receive screen credit for his contributions to the film. His frustration with Universal and Hollywood reached its peak when he was not hired to direct All Quiet on the Western Front and Fejos broke his contract with the studio. He signed a contract with Metro Goldwyn Mayer shortly afterwards, but only directed the German and French language versions of The Big House.

European career
In 1931 Fejos accepted an invitation from Pierre Braunberger to direct early sound films in France and left Hollywood for good. Fejos complained to a reporter that Hollywood was too commercial and like a drug for the public. He went on to state that the Hollywood-fantasy happy endings simply blinded working people from their hopeless lives and that "if the movie theaters were suddenly closed in America, there would be a revolution", but that in Europe he hoped for "films made in the name of art." Fejos's career in France was short-lived and began with his supervision of Claude Heymann's American Love in 1931. Next Fejos made the ambitious Fantômas, a remake of the famous serial made by Louis Feuillade in the 1910s.

In 1932 Fejos returned to Hungary to direct Spring Shower (Tavaszi Zápor), which some film critics have called his best film. The film stars Annabella as a young girl who is seduced and abandoned, has a child, and dies in poverty only to have to scrub floors in Heaven. While in Heaven, she sees that her now-teenage daughter is about to make the same mistake that she made and dumps her wash bucket to cause a rain storm and prevent it. Jonathan Rosenbaum praised the film, stating that it had "some magical moments of its own. Much as Lonesome seems indebted to the city and amusement park scenes in Sunrise, the nocturnal lighting and sensuality of Marie's seduction and its mysterious musical aftermath recall certain rustic night scenes in the same film. But unlike the determinism of Murnau's compositions and camera movements, Fejos' anthropological distance and fairy-tale encapsulations imply a different sort of relationship to his characters: the rapid cutting between details in a brothel parlous to convey Marie's confusion before fainting encourages an identification with sensations, not thoughts or feelings. And the beauty of Annabella's performance and a violin-and-clarinet theme may help one overlook some of the more reductive aspects of the folk legend that define the films dimensions." Fejos fell in love with Annabella and supposedly flew over her train back to France in a small plane and showered it with roses. Fejos's friend John W. Dodds has stated that "every time [Fejos] moved to another country, it was because of an ending love affair" and Fejos would spend the next few years throughout different European countries, often with frequent collaborators Lothar Wolff, his assistant director, and Ferenc Farkas, his composer. Fejos' second Hungarian film was The Verdict of Lake Balaton (Itél a Balaton) in 1932. In this film Fejos used beautiful documentary-like footage of local fishermen and their everyday lives. The film was highly criticized in Hungary for its depiction of the fisherman and accused of bigotry against village life.

In 1933 Fejos moved to Austria and made Ray of Sunshine (Sonnenstrahl), again starring Annabella. The film focused on unemployment and poverty in post-World War I Austria and was praised by critics as "the summit of Fejos' art in Europe...too often ignored by the critics." Later that year Fejos made the light comedy Voices of Spring (Frühlingstimmen).

In 1934 Fejos moved to Denmark and made three films for the Nordisk Film company: a light comedy in 1934 called Flight of the millions (Flugten fra millionerne), a farce about a world where there are no prisoners or police officers called Prisoner Number 1 (Fange Nr. 1) in 1935, and an adaptation of playwright Kaj Munk's The Golden Smile (Det Gyldne Smil) about the relationship between art and life in 1935.

Career as ethnographic filmmaker
By 1935 Fejos had grown tired of narrative films and their inauthentic sets and stories. That year he was sent by Nordisk Film to scout filming locations in Madagascar and loved the country so much that he ended up staying for nine months. He filmed over 30,000 feet of footage of animals, plants, tribal societies and local customs, all of which was unusable for a narrative feature. He also collected many artifacts and eventually donated them to the Royal Danish Geographical Society. When he returned to Denmark the unusable footage that he had shot was brought to the attention Svensk Filmindustri's Gunnar Skoglund who commissioned a series of six short documentaries to be made from the footage. These films included Black Horizons (Svarta Horisonter), The Dancers of Esira, Beauty Salon in the Jungle, The Most Useful Tree in the World, Sea Devil, and The Graves of our Father, all released between 1935 and 1936. In 1936, he married Inga Arvad, a Danish journalist, noted for being a guest of Adolf Hitler at the 1936 Summer Olympics and for her romantic relationship with John F. Kennedy. Arvad had appeared in Flight of the millions and the two remained married until 1942.

Inspired by his newfound passion for cultures and history, Fejos studied cultural anthropology at the Museum of Copenhagen in 1936 and studied under Dr. Thompson. He was then commissioned by Svensk Filmindustri to make a series of ethnographic films in such countries as Indonesia, the Philippines, New Guinea, Ceylon and Thailand from 1937 to 1938. These films included A Handful of Rice (En Handfull Ris), Man and Woman (Man och Kvinna), The Tribe Still Lives (Stammen lever än), The Bamboo Age of Mentawei (Bambuåldern på Mentawei), The Chief's Son is Dead (Hövdingens son är död), The Komodo Dragon (Draken på Komodo) and The Village Near Pleasant Fountain (Byn vid den trivsamma brunnen).

In 1938 while returning from filming in Thailand Fejos met Swedish industrialist Axel Wenner-Gren, who would change Fejos' life in the same way that Edward Spitz had ten years earlier. The two men became fast friends and Wenner-Gren agreed to finance an expedition to Peru in late 1939. While in Cusco Fejos was told by a Franciscan friar about a legendary lost city somewhere in the jungle. He immediately contacted Wenner-Gren, who agreed to give additional financing for the expedition. Fejos discovered 18 ancient Incan cities and traveled to the headwaters of the Amazon river. In total, he spent a year in Peru studying the culture and filming the Yagua tribe. His research resulted in Fejos' final series of films Yagua, released in 1940 and 1941. It also resulted in the publication of Ethnology of the Yagua, published by the Viking Fund Series of Publications in Anthropology in 1943.

Career as anthropologist and final years
In 1941, Fejos both stopped making films and travelling to become Director of Research and acting head of the Viking Fund, a non-profit foundation based in New York City and created that same year by Axel Wenner-Gren. It was later renamed the Wenner-Gren Foundation for Anthropological Research. He went on to become highly respected in his field and was considered ahead of his time for calling for communication between various branches of anthropology. During this time Fejos also taught at Stanford, Yale and Columbia University.

In 1958 Fejos married anthropologist Lita Binns, who would succeed him as research Director when he died on 23 April 1963. His obituary writer David Bidney said that "Paul Fejos had the temperament of an artist rather than a scholar or research scientist...He supported not only research projects but also, and primarily. individuals whom he trusted and considered worthy of support...His personal support of Pierre Teilhard de Chardin during the last years of the life of this eccentric genius is but one outstanding example...He leaves behind him the Wenner-Gren Foundation for Anthropological Research which he built, an international host of friends whom he helped, and a wife whom he cherished and appreciated."

Selected filmography
Lord Arthur Savile's Crime (1920)
Stars of Eger (1923)
The Last Moment (1928, lost film)
Lonesome (1928)
Broadway (1929)
The Last Performance (1929)
The Big House (1930, German and French versions)
 Captain of the Guard (1930 Uncredited )
 Men Behind Bars (1931)
 American Love (1931)
Fantômas (1932)
Spring Shower (1932)
The Verdict of Lake Balaton (1932)
Voices of Spring (1933)
 Flight from the Millions (1934)
The Golden Smile (1935)
Prisoner Number One (1935)
 Svarta horisonter (1936, series of 6 short documentaries)
 Stammen lever än (1937
 Bambuåldern på Mantaivei (1937)
 Hövdingens son är död (1937)
 Draken på Komodo (1937)
 Byn vid den trivsamma brunnen (1937)
 Tambora (1938)
 Att segla är nödvändigt (1938)
 En handfull ris (1938)
 Man och kvinna (1939)
Yagua (1941)

Further reading
Büttner, Elisabeth (2004). Paul Fejos Die Welt macht Film. Vienna, Austria: verlag filmarchiv Austria, Wien.

See also 
Runkuraqay

References

External links

 
 Literature on Paul Fejos
 The Travels of Paul Fejos

1897 births
1963 deaths
Hungarian film directors
Ethnographers
Hungarian emigrants to the United States
Film people from Budapest
Silent film directors
Visual anthropologists